Events from the year 1371 in Ireland.

Incumbent
Lord: Edward III

Events
John de Bothby, or Boothby, became Lord Chancellor of Ireland.

Births

Deaths
 Murchadh Ó Madadhain, Chief of Síol Anmchadha, fl. (born 1347)

References